José Atilio Benítez Parada (born June 21, 1958) is Salvadoran General, ambassador and former Minister of Defense of El Salvador.
 In 1992 he was Military attaché in Madrid, Bonn, Paris and London.
 In the second half of 2007 he was artillery colonel and commander of Cuscatlan IX in Building 1 Camp Delta, in Wasit, Iraq.
 In 2009 he was Inspector of the Armed Forces of El Salvador.
On  Mauricio Funes named David Victoriano Munguía Payés as Minister of National Defense and José Atilio Benitez Parada as deputy defense minister.
 From  to 2013 José Atilio Benítez Parada was Minister of Defense of El Salvador in the cabinet of Mauricio Funes.
 From  to  he was ambassador in Madrid.
Since  he is accredited as ambassador in Berlin with coaccredición in Warsaw, Prague and Ankara.

References

1958 births
Living people
Ambassadors of El Salvador to Germany
Ambassadors of El Salvador to Spain
Defence ministers of El Salvador